The Men's individual normal hill event of the FIS Nordic World Ski Championships 2015 was held on 21 February 2015. A qualifying will be held on 20 February.

Results

Qualifying
The qualifying was started at 19:00.

Final
The first round was started at 16:30 and the second round at 17:40.

References

Men's individual normal hill